Nápoles is an ancient Portuguese family. Nápoles or Napoles may also refer to
Nápoles (surname)
Colonia Nápoles in Mexico City
Nápoles (Mexico City Metrobús), a BRT station in Mexico City
Hacienda Nápoles in Colombia